

Steroidogenic enzymes are enzymes that are involved in steroidogenesis and steroid biosynthesis. They are responsible for the biosynthesis of the steroid hormones, including sex steroids (androgens, estrogens, and progestogens) and corticosteroids (glucocorticoids and mineralocorticoids), as well as neurosteroids, from cholesterol. Steroidogenic enzymes are most highly expressed in classical steroidogenic tissues, such as the testis, ovary, and adrenal cortex, but are also present in other tissues in the body.

List of steroidogenic enzymes
 Steroid desmolases
 Cholesterol side-chain cleavage enzyme (20,22-desmolase) – steroid synthesis
 17,20-Lyase (17,20-desmolase) – androgen synthesis
 Steroid hydroxylases
 11β-Hydroxylase – corticosteroid synthesis
 17α-Hydroxylase – androgen and glucocorticoid synthesis
 18-Hydroxylase (aldosterone synthase) – mineralocorticoid synthesis
 21-Hydroxylase – corticosteroid synthesis
 Cytochrome P450 (CYP1, 2, 3) – estrogen metabolism
 Hydroxysteroid dehydrogenases (and ketosteroid reductases)
 3α-Hydroxysteroid dehydrogenase – androgen, progestogen, and neurosteroid synthesis and metabolism
 3β-Hydroxysteroid dehydrogenase/Δ5-4-isomerase (1, 2) – androgen, progestogen, and neurosteroid synthesis
 11β-Hydroxysteroid dehydrogenase (1, 2) – corticosteroid synthesis and metabolism
 17β-Hydroxysteroid dehydrogenase (1–15) – androgen, estrogen, and progestogen synthesis and metabolism
 20α-Hydroxysteroid dehydrogenase – progestogen synthesis and metabolism
 20β-Hydroxysteroid dehydrogenase – progestogen synthesis and metabolism

 Steroid reductases
 5α-Reductase (1, 2, 3) – androgen and neurosteroid synthesis, progestogen metabolism
 5β-Reductase – androgen and progestogen metabolism, neurosteroid synthesis
 Conjugation (and deconjugation)
 Glucuronosyltransferase (UGT2Bs) – steroid metabolism
 Glucuronidase (β-glucuronidase) – steroid synthesis
 Steroid sulfotransferase (SULT1A1, 1E1, 2A1, 2B1a, 2B1b) – steroid metabolism, neurosteroid synthesis
 Steroid sulfatase – steroid synthesis, neurosteroid metabolism
 Others
 Aromatase (estrogen synthetase) – estrogen synthesis

See also
 Inborn errors of steroid metabolism
 Steroidogenesis inhibitor

References

Enzymes
Steroids